Gödəklər (also, Gëdaklar and Kyudaklar) is a village and municipality in the Beylagan Rayon of Azerbaijan.  It has a population of 517.

References 

Populated places in Beylagan District